Maxol is an Irish oil company, part of McMullan Bros. Limited. It was founded in 1920.

Organisation

Republic of Ireland
Maxol Lubricants Ltd. (Lubricant supplier to the automotive, industrial, marine, and agricultural markets)
Maxol Direct Ltd. (Home heating oil)
Maxol Ltd. (Main petrol station retail network and bulk fuel seller)
Estuary Fuel Ltd. (Oil terminal operator, petrol stations and various oil products)
Marsh Oil Products Ltd. (Main import terminal)

Northern Ireland
Maxol Oil Ltd. (Main petrol station retail network and bulk fuel seller)
DGS Logistics, Fuel Distribution for Maxol petrol stations in Northern Ireland and some Republic of Ireland regions. Formerly Trevdon Oil Distribution.
Maxol Leebody Fuels (Home heating oil)
Maxol Irwin Fuels (Home heating oil)

History
In 1919, William and James McMullan signed a supply agreement with the Anglo Mexican Oil Company (AMOC) and in 1920 founded McMullan Bros. Limited. In 1924, AMOC was acquired by Shell; however, McMullen Bros. retained the rights to use the Mex brand name in Ireland.

In 1972, the existing brand names of Mex, Silensol and Daisy, began to be replaced by the Maxol brand, though all operating companies only completed this process in 1981. In 1986, Maxol acquired Ola, operator of an oil terminal at Drogheda, County Louth. In 1996, Maxol acquired 80 retail sites from Statoil and Jet which were to be disposed of as a condition of their merger. In 1997, the group signed a partnership with Mace, a convenience store group, to allow development of joint Maxol/Mace filling stations.

In 2000, Maxol acquired Northern Ireland's leading heating oil distributor, Connors Fuels Ltd.. This became Maxol Direct (NI) Ltd. In 2002, it acquired Estuary Fuel Limited which operates an oil terminal, a retail network and markets various oil products.

In 2011, Maxol Direct home heating oil was sold to DCC Energy, which also owns Emo. That same year, they stopped producing the alternative e85, a type of biofuel made from whey in cheese processing for FFV (Flex Fuel Vehicle).

References

www.maxol.ie: Company history
www.maxoldirect.com: Group information

Oil companies of the Republic of Ireland
Non-renewable resource companies established in 1920
Irish brands
1920 establishments in Ireland
Products introduced in 1972